Bruce Campbell (born 1958) is an American actor.

Bruce Campbell may also refer to:
 Bruce Campbell (Alberta politician) (1923–2011), Edmonton city alderman
 Bruce Campbell (gridiron football) (born 1988), American football offensive tackle
 Bruce Campbell (Australian footballer) (1890–1964), Australian rules footballer
 Bruce Campbell (barrister) (1916–1990), New Zealand-born British barrister and politician
 Bruce Campbell (baseball) (1909–1995), American baseball player
 Bruce Campbell (historian) (born 1949), British economic historian
 Bruce Campbell (ornithologist) (1912–1993), British ornithologist and writer
 Jobriath (1946–1983), American musician born Bruce Wayne Campbell